Kidar Nath Sharma, also Kedar Sharma (12 April 1910 – 29 April 1999), was an Indian film director, producer, screenwriter, and Lyricist of Hindi films. While he had great success as a director of such movies as Neel Kamal (1947), Bawre Nain (1950) and Jogan (1950). He is most remembered for starting the acting careers of popular Bollywood actors like Madhubala, Geeta Bali,  Raj Kapoor, Mala Sinha, Bharat Bhushan and Tanuja.

Early life and education
Kidar Sharma was born in a Punjabi brahmin family Narowal in what was then the Punjab region of India and grew up in a life of poverty. Two brothers, Ragunath and Vishwa had died as infants and his sister, Taro, died of Tuberculosis at an early age. A younger sister Guro survived as did a younger brother, Himmat Rai Sharma, who would later work with Kidar on films before establishing himself as a successful Urdu poet. Kidar attended the Baij Nath High School in Amritsar where he became interested in philosophy, poetry, painting and photography. Upon completion of high school, he ran away from home to pursue a career in cinema in Mumbai but was unsuccessful in gaining employment. He returned to Amritsar and attended the Hindu Sabha College where he founded a College Dramatic Society which would later give him his first break in film.

Career
The head of a local Temperance movement would attend one of Kidar's plays and hired him to produce a silent film depicting the evils of alcohol. Using the money he earned from this project he would receive his master's degree in English at Khalsa College, Amritsar before joining a local theatre group that earned him limited acting success in 1931. He was married in 1932 and painted to earn income. Upon seeing an early talkies film Puran Bhagat (1933) by film director Debaki Bose, he left for Calcutta hoping to get his big break at New Theatres Studios, where Debaki Bose worked. After many months of unemployment he managed to meet a then-unknown actor of New Theatres, Prithviraj Kapoor (where he would meet Prithviraj's eight-year-old son for the first time, Raj Kapoor). Prithviraj Kapoor introduced Kidar to his neighbour, then-unknown Kundan Lal Saigal, who through an acquaintance allowed Kidar to meet Debaki Bose. Debaki Bose hired Kidar initially to become the Movie stills photographer for the film Seeta (1934) but would give Kidar his first part in the creation of film with that of a backdrop screen painter and a poster painter for the film Inquilab (1935) where Kidar also had a bit part. Kidar would continue to work with New Theatres on films such as Dhoop Chhaon (1935) and Pujarin (1936) but a big break would come when Kidar was asked to write the dialogue and lyrics for the 1936 adaptation of Devdas starring his friend Kundan Lal Saigal. Devdas was not only a hit, but songs from the film such as Balam Aaye Baso Moray Man Mein and Dukh Ke Ab Din Beetat Naahi became feverishly popular throughout the country, giving Kidar Sharma acclaim by the press and public. Kidar would later say, "Both Bimal Roy and I got our first big break in Devdas. He as the cameraman and I as the writer."

Kidar's big directing break came in 1940 when asked to complete the film Tumhair Jeet. Upon its completion he was given the opportunity to direct his own screenplay for Aulad / Dil Hi to Hai, which met with some success. He was then asked to direct Chitralekha (1941) which became a smash hit and gave Kidar credibility as a director. He would go on to begin producing his own movies, casting Raj Kapoor and Madhubala in their first film Neel Kamal. He would also cast Geeta Bali in her first movie, Sohag Raat (1948) and later he would team her with Raj Kapoor for the film Bawre Nain (1950). That same year he directed Jogan starring Nargis and Dilip Kumar. In the late 1950s Jawaharlal Nehru who had heard Sharma's lyrics, summoned him and asked him to become director-in-chief of the Children's Film Society. Kidar Sharma would work on many movies for the Children's Film Society, including the film Jaldeep which would go on to receive international acclaim. In 1958, he would work for one year directing movies in Singapore for Shaw Brothers Studio.

An outstanding poet, Sharma wrote some of the most memorable songs including Balam aayo baso more man mein, Dukh kay ab din beetat nahi, Khayalon Mein Kisike (Bawre Nain), Kabhi Tanhaiyon Mein Bhi (Hamari Yaad Aayegi) and Teri duniya mein dil lagta nahi. Kidar would continue to contribute as a lyricist and to write and direct films through the 1990s. Ironically, many Indian film critics and historians argued that he deserved the highest cinema award from the government of India but he died a day before he was to receive the Raj Kapoor Award, named in honour of the actor he helped make a success.

His autobiography, The One and Lonely Kidar Sharma was published posthumously in 2002, edited by his son Vikram Sharma.

Awards and nominations

International honours and recognitions
 Part of the Indian Delegation in 1945 which travelled to England and Hollywood and met with Charlie Chaplin, Walt Disney and Cecil B. DeMille
 Best Children's Film, International Film Festival at Venice 1957 for Jaldeep

National honours and recognitions
 1956: National Film Award for Best Children's Film: Jaldeep
 Indian Film Directors' Association Lifetime Achievement Award
 Gold Award from Prime Minister Indira Gandhi in 1982 for contribution to Indian Cinema
 Government of Maharashtra's Raj Kapoor Award (awarded in 1999 after his death)

Filmography
 Inquilab (1935), Set Painter, actor
 Dhoop Chhaon (1935), actor, Assistant Manager
 Pujarin (1936), actor
 Karodpati a.k.a. Millionaire (1936), actor, lyrics
 Devdas (1936), Dialogue and lyrics
 Vidyapati (1937), actor
 Anath Ashram (1937), writer
 Jawani Ki Reet (1939), Dialogue
 Badi Didi (1939), writer, actor
 Tumhai Jeet (1939), lyricist (film directed by Ranjit Sen).
 Dil Hi Toh Hai (1939) Director, lyricist
 Zindagi (1940), Writer
 Aulad (1940), director
 Chitralekha (1941), director
 Armaan (1942), director
 Gauri (1942), director
 Mumtaz Mahal (1944), director
 Dhanna Bhagat (1945), director
 Chand Chakori (1945), director
 Duniya Ek Sarai (1946), director
 Neel Kamal (1947), writer, director, producer
 Sohag Raat (1948), director
 Neki Aur Badi (1949), director, actor
 Thes (1949), director
 Bawre Nain (1950), writer, director, producer
 Jogan (1950), director
 Gunah (1953), director
 Chora-Chori (1954), director
 Rangeen Raaten (1956), producer, director, lyricist
 Hamari Yaad Aayegi (1961), director, lyricist
 Fariyad (1964), director
 Chitralekha (1964), director, writer
 Kaajal (1965), writer
 Pehla Kadam (1981), Director

He's Filmography list is  incomplete need to done more work.

Children's Film Society of India Contributions
 Jaldeep (Light House) (1956), writer, director
 Ganga Ki Lahren (1957), writer, director
 Bachchon Se Bate (Talking To Children) (1957), writer, director
 Haria (1958), writer
 Gulab Ka Phool (The Rose Among Flowers) (1958), writer, director
 26 January (India's Republic Day) (1959), writer, director
 Ekta (In Unison) (1959), writer, director
 Guru Bhakti (Devotion) (1959), writer
 Panchtantra Ki Ek Kahani (A Story From The Panchantra) (1959), writer
 Yatra (Journey) (1959), writer
 Dilli Ki Kahani (The Story of Delhi City) (1960), writer
 Chetak (1960), writer, director
 Meera Ka Chitra (Portrait of Meera) (1960), writer, director
 Nyaya ( Justice) (1960), Camera
 Mahateerth (Great Pilgrimage) (1961), writer, director
 Khuda Hafiz (Goodbye) (1983), writer, director, lyricist

Bibliography
 The One and Lonely Kidar Sharma (an anecdotal autobiography), ed. Vikram Sharma. Bluejay Books, 2002. .

References

External links
 
 The        genius of film-making named:  Kidar        Sharma 

Bengali film directors
1910 births
1999 deaths
Hindi-language film directors
Indian male screenwriters
Indian lyricists
Bengali film producers
People from Narowal District
Guru Nanak Dev University alumni
Indian movie stills photographers
20th-century Indian film directors
Film directors from Mumbai
Film producers from Mumbai
Hindi film producers
Directors who won the Best Children's Film National Film Award
20th-century Indian screenwriters
20th-century Indian male writers